Depok Station (DP) is a railway station located in Pancoran Mas, Pancoran Mas, Depok, West Java. This station commonly known as Depok Lama. The station is one of the oldest station in Jakarta metropolitan area. At present it serves as a station of Jakarta Commuter Rail. Depok EMU depot is located to the southwest of the station.

Since 25 March 2021, this station along with Bekasi, Tanah Abang, Kranji, Jakarta Kota, Depok Baru, Bojonggede, Citayam, Parungpanjang and Angke stations officially ceased the sale of Guaranteed Daily Tickets ( or THB) for KRL Commuterline services.

History

In the 17th to 18th centuries, Depok was a kawedanan area as well as a plantation founded by the landlord Cornelis Chastelein. Until the 19th century the city that Chastelein built continued to grow. Given the increasing need for transporting plantations and passengers, in the late 1860s the Batavia–Buitenzorg railway line was built by the Nederlandsch-Indische Spoorweg Maatschappij, the first heavy rail company in the Dutch East Indies.

The station was opened by the NIS at the same time as the opening of the last segment, Meester Cornelis N.I.S.–Buitenzorg on 31 January 1873. Unlike the Samarang–Vorstenlanden railway, which uses a gauge width of 1,435 mm, the NIS uses a 1,067 mm gauge for this route. On 1 November 1913, the Staatsspoorwegen officially purchased the NIS assets on the line and eventually developed this station.

In connection with the development of SS services, electric trains and electric locomotives have started running on the Tandjongpriok (Tanjung Priuk)–Batavia–Buitenzorg and Tandjongpriok–Meester Cornelis (Jatinegara) lines. To realize this, the SS built overhead line poles along these lines, and on 6 April 1925, the electric multiple unit started operating in conjunction with the 50th anniversary of Staatsspoorwegen's contributions in Java.

At the end of the '80s, the Depok Station was rebuilt, all the old lines, the old catenary pole, demolished because the line from Manggarai–Depok was built double tracks. Since then, the old building has ceased to exist.

Building and layout 
To the south from Depok Station, there is a KRL depot, which is the largest in Southeast Asia. Now this station has four lines to speed up KRL Commuterline trips from Bogor and for the final stop for trains bound for Depok Station. Depok Station has its own uniqueness. If in general stations that have 4 lines, such as Gambir, upper Manggarai, Tambun, Pasar Minggu, and Cakung Stations, lines 2 and 3 are straight tracks, then Depok Station lines 1 and 4 are straight tracks.

Services 
The following is a list of train services at the Depok Station.

Passenger services 
 KAI Commuter

Supporting transportation

Incidents 
 On 25 July 2013, a KRL Commuterline train was on fire on 09:14 WIB. It was suspected that the fire was caused by AC compressor malfuction.
 On 5 December 2018, a KRL Commuterline train emits thick white smoke. There were no casualties, but caused panic among passengers. As a result, the passengers had to be diverted and the fleet immediately brought to the Depok KRL Depot for inspection.

References

External links

Buildings and structures in Depok
Railway stations in West Java
Railway stations opened in 1873
1870s establishments in the Dutch East Indies